Live at the BBC or BBC Recordings are recordings originally made for or by BBC Radio 1. Many recordings were released under several name variants.

Live at the BBC
Live at the BBC (The Beatles album), 1994
On Air – Live at the BBC Volume 2 (The Beatles album), 2013
Live at the BBC (The Beautiful South album)
Live at the BBC (Robert Cray album), 2008
Live at the BBC (Curved Air album), 1995
Live at the BBC (Sandy Denny album), 2007
Live at the BBC (Dire Straits album), 1995
Live at the BBC (Electric Light Orchestra album), 1999
Live at the BBC (Fairport Convention album), 2007
Live at the BBC (Fleetwood Mac album), 1995
Live at the BBC (Free album), 2006
Live at the BBC (Focus album), 2004
Live at the BBC (Steve Harley & Cockney Rebel album), 1995 
Live at the BBC (The Housemartins album)
Live at the BBC: 1967–1970 (The Moody Blues album), 2007
Live at the BBC (Shed Seven album), 2007
Live at the BBC (Slade album), 2009
Live at the BBC (Status Quo album), 2010
Live at the BBC (Richard & Linda Thompson album), 2011
Live at the BBC, Maria McKee, 1991

Live at the Beeb
Live at the Beeb, the 2nd EP of The Universal, by Blur, 1995

At the BBC
Soft Cell at the BBC, 2003
Pixies at the BBC, 1998
At the Beeb, a 1989 album by Queen
At the BBC (Siouxsie and the Banshees album), 2009
Bowie at the Beeb, a 2000 David Bowie album
At the BBC, a 2001 Mighty Mighty album
At the BBC (Joe Jackson album), 2009
At the BBC, a 2009 Shawn Phillips album
R.E.M. at the BBC, a 2018 R.E.M. album

BBC Sessions
The BBC Sessions (Belle and Sebastian album), 2008
BBC Sessions (The Searchers album), 2004
BBC Sessions (Cocteau Twins album), 1999
BBC Sessions (Cream album), 2003
BBC Sessions (Rory Gallagher album), 1999
BBC Sessions (The Jimi Hendrix Experience album), 1998
BBC Sessions (Led Zeppelin album), 1997
The BBC Sessions (Ocean Colour Scene)
BBC Sessions (Saxon album), 1998
BBC Sessions (The Specials album), 1998
BBC Sessions (Texas album), 2007
BBC Sessions (Tindersticks album), 2007
BBC Sessions (Loudon Wainwright III album), 1998 
BBC Sessions (The Who album), 2000
BBC Sessions (The Yardbirds album)
BBC Sessions 1968–1970 (Deep Purple album), 2011
The Complete BBC Sessions (Cast)
Swing the Heartache: The BBC Sessions, a 1989 Bauhaus album
The BBC Sessions (Electric Light Orchestra album), 1999
The BBC Sessions (Small Faces album), 1999
BBC Sessions (Green Day album), 2021
BBC Sessions (2002) by The Nice
The Complete BBC Sessions (1997) by Argent
The BBC Sessions 1989–2001 (2008) by The Orb
 BBC Sessions (1997) by The Delgados
Taking On the World: Deluxe Edition - Disc Three: BBC Sessions, by Gun
BBC Sessions 1964-1977 (2001) by The Kinks

Radio 1 Sessions
The Radio One Sessions (Syd Barrett album), 2004
Radio 1 Sessions (Big Country album), 1994
The Radio One Sessions (Cowboy Junkies album), 2002
The Radio One Sessions (The Damned album), 1996
The Radio One Sessions (Elastica album), 2001
Radio 1 Sessions (Generation X album)
Radio 1 Sessions (Inspiral Carpets album), 1996
The Radio One Sessions (Stiff Little Fingers album)

BBC Recordings
The BBC Recordings (Budgie album)
The BBC Recordings (The Sound album)
Radiation (BBC Recordings 84–86), by Cabaret Voltaire

Other recordings
BBC Radio 1 Live in Concert, a series of albums by Windsong
BBC Live & In-Session, a 2005 Motörhead album
BBC Archives (album), a 2002 Iron Maiden album
BBC in Session, The La's album
BBC Live, a 2005 Violent Femmes album
Government Commissions: BBC Sessions 1996–2003, a Mogwai album
Radio One (album), a 1988 Jimi Hendrix Experience album
BBC Radio Sessions, an album by The Bluetones
Something's Coming: The BBC Recordings 1969–1970, a Yes (band) album
On Air, a 2016 Queen album

BBC Radio 1